Xenon tetrachloride is an unstable inorganic compound with the chemical formula XeCl4. Unlike other noble gas/halide compounds, it cannot be synthesized by simply combining the elements, by using a more-active halogenating agent, or by substitution of other halides on tetrahaloxenon compounds. Instead, a decay technique can be used, starting with K129ICl4. The iodine-129 atom of the  covalent cluster is radioactive and undergoes beta decay to become xenon-129. The resulting XeCl4 molecule has a square planar molecular geometry analogous to xenon tetrafluoride.

Alternately, the product can be obtained by subjecting the elements to an electric discharge.

References 

Xenon(IV) compounds
Chlorides